Charles Hardie Buzacott (1 August 1835 – 19 July 1918) was an Australian journalist, publisher and politician.

Early life
Buzacott was born in Torrington, Devonshire, England, son of James Buzacott and his wife Ann, née Hitchcock. He migrated with his elder brother William to Sydney in 1852.

Journalism
In Sydney, Charles joined the Empire newspaper and learnt to be a compositor. In 1860 he went to Maryborough, Queensland, and established the Maryborough Chronicle, selling it four years later. Buzacott then went to the Clermont goldfield, and started the Peak Downs Telegram, which he edited. In 1869 Buzacott sold his interest in the Telegram and moved to Gladstone where he took over the Observer. In 1870 Charles joined his brother William on the Rockhampton Bulletin, which the latter had established in 1861.

In 1878 he moved to Brisbane, and became a leader writer on the Courier.

During November 1880 he purchased Gresley Lukin's shares in the Brisbane Newspaper Company, the proprietor of the Brisbane Courier and its weekly The Queenslander and took on Lukin's former position as the company's managing editor and director. He was to remain in this position until 1894, occasionally taking and active role in the editing and occasionally contributing articles and editorials for the journals.

He later bought the Rockhampton Argus and converted it into an evening paper, the Daily Record.

He founded the Daily Mail in Brisbane in 1904, and in spite of his advancing years carried it through its early difficulties as editor and managing director.

Politics
In 1873 Charles Buzacott was elected to the Legislative Assembly of Queensland for Rockhampton. In 1874, and again in 1876, he brought in bills in an attempt to establish an eight-hour work day in Queensland, but he was in advance of his times and did not succeed in steering them past the committee stage. He resigned from the assembly in 1877.

Having been returned to the assembly again, in January 1879 he became postmaster-general in McIlwraith's  first ministry, and was responsible for the drafting of the divisional boards measure which was the foundation of later Queensland local government acts. He was an active minister, and during his two years of office he united the previously separate post and telegraph departments, and succeeded in having tenders called for a Torres Straits service between Brisbane and London. The telephone was also introduced during his period.

He was appointed to the Queensland Legislative Council in 1894; although a lifetime appointment, he resigned in May 1901 and did not hold political office again.

Later life
With his health failing, he retired to Stanthorpe in 1906 but continued to make occasional contributions to the press until not long before his death at Banca View in Stanthorpe on 19 July 1918.

Buzacott had married Louisa Whiteford in 1857 who survived him with three sons and two daughters.

Street name
A number of street names in the Brisbane suburb of Carina Heights are identical to the surnames of former Members of the Queensland Legislative Assembly. One of these is Buzacott Street.

References

Further reading
Clem Lack, 'Buzacott, Charles Hardie (1835–1918)', Australian Dictionary of Biography, Volume 3, Melbourne University Press, 1969, pp 320–321.

Australian journalists
1835 births
1918 deaths
Members of the Queensland Legislative Council
Members of the Queensland Legislative Assembly
People from Maryborough, Queensland
People from Rockhampton
Australian newspaper editors